Hyperaspis bolteri is a species of lady beetle in the family Coccinellidae. It is found in North America. It is generally 3.0-3.25mm in size, and is describes as having a "highly distinctive color pattern and extremely dull pronotal surface."

References

Further reading

 

Coccinellidae
Articles created by Qbugbot
Beetles described in 1880